Sanghaganam is a 1979 Indian Malayalam-language political drama film directed by P. A. Backer based on a story by M. Sukumaran and starring Sreenivasan, Ramu Karyat, P. R. Nambyar and Madhu Master.

Plot 

An unemployed youth decides to protest against the cruel world.

Cast 
Sreenivasan
Ramu Kariyat
Madhu Master
PR Nambiar

References

External links 
 

1970s Malayalam-language films
1979 films
Films directed by P. A. Backer